Baron Davies may refer to:

 Baron Davies, a hereditary peerage created in 1932
 David Davies, 1st Baron Davies (1880−1944), Welsh politician and philanthropist
 David Davies, 3rd Baron Davies (born 1940), Welsh peer
 Mervyn Davies, Baron Davies of Abersoch (born 1952), British banker and government minister
 Garfield Davies, Baron Davies of Coity (1935−2019), British trade union leader
 Harold Davies, Baron Davies of Leek (1904−1985), British Labour Party politician
 Bryan Davies, Baron Davies of Oldham (born 1939), British government leader
 Elfed Davies, Baron Davies of Penrhys (1913−1992), Welsh Labour Party politician
 Quentin Davies, Baron Davies of Stamford (born 1944), British Labour Party politician

See also
Baron Davis (born 1979), American former basketball player